26th FFCC Awards
December 22, 2021

Best Picture:
The Power of the Dog

The 26th Florida Film Critics Circle Awards were held on December 22, 2021.

The nominations were announced on December 15, 2021, led by The Power of the Dog with nine nominations.

Winners and nominees

Winners are listed at the top of each list in bold, while the runner-ups for each category are listed under them.

References

External links
 

2021 film awards
2020s